The Concorde ... Airport '79 is a 1979 American air disaster film (in the UK, it was released a year later as Airport '80: The Concorde) and the fourth and final installment of the Airport franchise. Although poorly reviewed by critics and earning poorly in North America, the film was a huge hit internationally, for a total gross of $65 million on a $14 million budget.

The film was directed by David Lowell Rich. The all-star cast includes George Kennedy, who appeared in all four films from the Airport series, and starring Alain Delon, Susan Blakely and Robert Wagner in the main roles.  Mercedes McCambridge and Martha Raye have cameos.

Plot
Kevin Harrison, a corrupt arms dealer, attempts to destroy an American-owned Concorde on its maiden flight after one of the passengers, reporter Maggie Whelan, learns of his weapons sales to communist countries during the Cold War.

The Concorde takes off from Charles de Gaulle Airport in Paris and lands at Dulles Airport outside Washington, D.C.

Maggie reports on the flight the following day, which leads to a story of Harrison and his Buzzard surface-to-air missile project. A man named Carl Parker shows up to Maggie with a claim about documentation of illegal arms deals, but is shot by an assailant who chases Maggie throughout the house before a passerby triggers a fire alarm, scaring the assailant away.

Maggie is told by Harrison someone is framing him. He sends Maggie off in a limo, then plots to destroy the Concorde with Maggie on it by reprogramming an attack drone test with the Concorde as the new target.

Capt. Joe Patroni and Capt. Paul Metrand board the Concorde, where they are joined by Peter O'Neill, the 2nd officer and flight engineer.

Harrison surprises Maggie at the airline check-in desk to see her off. He asks whether the documents have shown up, but they have not. As he is walking away, Parker's wife delivers the documents to Maggie as she steps into the mobile lounge. She looks them over and realizes that Harrison has lied to her.

The Concorde takes off for Paris. Unbeknownst to the flight crew, an off-course surface-to-air missile is headed straight for them. At his company headquarters, Harrison tells his controllers to alert the government. The USAF scrambles F-15 fighter jets to intercept the missile as it locks onto the Concorde. After several evasive maneuvers by the passenger plane, an F-15 shoots down the missile.

As the Concorde is approaching the European coastline, an F-4 Phantom II sent by Harrison engages the Concorde as French Air Force Mirage F1s scramble to help. The Concorde evades the F-4's missiles, but the explosion of one of them damages the plane's hydraulics. The Mirages shoot down the F-4 before the Concorde reaches the French coastline to continue towards Paris.  Due to hydraulic system damage, the plane lands at Le Bourget Airport instead of Charles de Gaulle.  The Concorde barely stops at the last safety net. Metrand and Isabelle invite Patroni to dinner.

Harrison promises Maggie to go public with the documents but attempts to bribe her into "polishing" his statement. After being paid by Harrison, a mechanic, Froelich, places a device in the Concorde's cargo door control unit, timed to open during flight.

As the passengers board, Froelich is in line at the security checkpoint when some of his money falls out of his trouser leg. The X-ray technician attempts to return it, but Froelich pretends not to hear and runs off. On the runway, where the Concorde is taking off, the aircraft's exhaust renders Froelich unconscious and scatters the money he received from Harrison.

En route to Moscow, the automatic device opens the cargo door. Metrand sees the carpet tear down the middle of the aisle, signifying the fuselage is under tremendous stress and the aircraft is about to break apart. The cargo door is ripped off, damaging the aircraft and ripping a segment of the floor as it spirals towards the ground. The airline founder's seat lodges in the hole, acting as a plug. The pilots attempt to fly to Innsbruck, Austria, for an emergency landing, but they are losing too much fuel and do not have enough to make it there. Metrand realizes they are flying towards a ski area he knows along the Alps in Patscherkofel; they could make a belly landing on a mountain-side.

The aircraft approaches the landing site while the ski patrol marks a runway, landing successfully. While passengers are being rescued, Maggie reports on the accident to a news reporter and mentions a major story she is about to release. Harrison, en route back to Washington, sees the newscast in his private plane and commits suicide. The last of the crew leaves the Concorde shortly before the fuselage explodes from leaking fuel.

Cast

Production
It took producer Jennings Lang a number of years to get permission from Air France to use the Concorde. Air France requested some changes to the story and dialogue. Lang argued the film was not a direct sequel because it used different characters and settings, apart from George Kennedy whose character was promoted to pilot.

The film was originally going to be called Airport '79 - the Concorde but Lang decided to rename it so it would not be confused with Airport 75 and Airport 77. In October 1978 Universal announced that filming would start in November. Susan Blakely appeared in the film as the first in a three-picture deal she signed with Universal following the success of Rich Man, Poor Man. Parts of the film were also shot in Alta, Utah. Filming had finished by February 1979.

Sylvia Kristel wrote in her memoirs that Delon was unhappy with the size of his trailer and insisted he be given Rich's trailer, which was larger. Rich complained to Lang, who supported Delon. Kristel wrote that towards the end the shoot, the director started "being overtly misogynistic. He treats me badly, shouting, making me repeat things all the time for no reason."

Reception

Critical reception
The film was the recipient of mostly negative reviews by critics upon its release, and years later holds an approval rating of 25% on the film review aggregator Rotten Tomatoes based on eight reviews.

Vincent Canby of The New York Times wrote, "'The Concorde — Airport '79' is — how should I put it? — not the best of the series, but to say that it's the worst is to convey the wrong impression. In this case, worst is best." Variety′s review called the film "Definitely not for sophisticates, "Concorde" is a throwback to the old popcorn genre, and rather enjoyable at that" but noted that "unintentional comedy still seems the "Airport" series' forte". Stu Goldstein BoxOffice graded the film as "Poor" and called it "so silly it's actually entertaining." David Ansen of Newsweek wrote, "You have to respect a movie so single-mindedly dedicated to High Silliness. The advantage of its blithe disregard for plausibility is a plot that zips along at such breakneck pace that the audience is too busy counting the holes in the Concorde to question the holes in the plot." Gene Siskel of the Chicago Tribune gave the film one star out of four and called the story "ludicrous." Sheila Benson of the Los Angeles Times wrote, "The disaster they face is as contrived as the characters. You never believe for a second that these passengers are in any danger, beyond getting airsick or mussing their hair." Gary Arnold of The Washington Post called the film "nearly as funny as 'The Big Bus,' albeit unwittingly."

Film critic Roger Ebert highlighted the film in his book I Hated, Hated, Hated This Movie, deriding the science in the scene where Patroni fires a flare gun out of the cockpit window.

It is also listed in Golden Raspberry Award founder John Wilson's book The Official Razzie Movie Guide as one of The 100 Most Enjoyably Bad Movies Ever Made.

Box office
Produced on a budget of $14 million, it earned a little over $13 million in the United States and Canada, thus ending the enormous financial success of the Airport films. Internationally the film still performed well, grossing $52 million for a worldwide total of $65 million.

Aircraft history

The Concorde aircraft used in the film first flew on January 31, 1975, and was registered as F-WTSC to the Aérospatiale aircraft company. It would be re-registered by Aérospatiale as F-BTSC and leased to Air France in 1976. In 1989, this Concorde carried Pope John Paul II.

On July 25, 2000, F-BTSC, as Air France Flight 4590, was hit by runway debris on takeoff, igniting the leaking fuel on the wing's fuel tank (part of the fuselage), and causing the aircraft to crash in the small French town of Gonesse, killing all 109 passengers and crew on board, as well as four on the ground. At the time of the accident, F-BTSC had logged 11,989 hours and 4,873 cycles.

Television premiere
For the film's May 1982 network television premiere on ABC, additional footage was added to expand the film's running time so it could be shown in a three-hour time slot.

See also
 Airport
 Airport 1975
 Airport '77
 Concorde Affaire '79
 SST: Death Flight, a 1977 made-for-TV movie also directed by David Lowell Rich

References

Notes

External links
 
 
 
 

1979 films
1970s disaster films
Concorde
Airport (film series)
American aviation films
American disaster films
Films about aviation accidents or incidents
Films directed by David Lowell Rich
Films set on airplanes
Universal Pictures films
American sequel films
Films with screenplays by Eric Roth
Films based on works by Arthur Hailey
Films scored by Lalo Schifrin
Films shot in Utah
1970s English-language films
1970s American films